Sandro Schärer (born 6 June 1988) is a Swiss professional football referee. He has been a full international for FIFA since 2015.

See also
List of football referees

References

External links
 Profile on Swiss Football Association homepage

1986 births
Living people
Swiss football referees
People from Bremgarten District
21st-century Swiss people